Palethorpe is a surname. Notable people with the surname include:

Arthur Palethorpe (1854–1916), New Zealand cricketer
Jack Palethorpe (1909–1984), British footballer
Phillip Palethorpe (born 1986), British footballer